The Invisible Victory is a 1977 spy thriller novel by the British writer Richard Gordon. A young British chemist working in Germany in the late 1930s is recruited by British intelligence to work on stealing scientific research from the Nazi authorities.

References

Bibliography
 Peacock, Scott. Contemporary Authors. Cengage Gale, 2002.

1977 British novels
Novels by Richard Gordon
Novels set in the 1930s
British thriller novels
British spy novels
Novels set during World War II
Heinemann (publisher) books